Charles Wesley Willard (June 18, 1827 – June 8, 1880) was an American politician, lawyer and newspaper editor. He served as a U.S. Representative from Vermont.

Biography

Willard was born in Lyndon, Vermont, son of Thomas Willard and Abigail (Carpenter) Willard. He attended Caledonia County Grammar School and graduated from Dartmouth College in Hanover, New Hampshire in 1851. Willard studied law and was admitted to the bar in 1853. He began the practice of law in Montpelier. In 1855 and 1856 he was Secretary of State of Vermont. He declined reelection, then served as member of the Vermont State Senate in 1860 and 1861. He became editor and publisher of the Daily Green Mountain Freeman in 1861, and served in those positions until 1873.

Willard was elected as a Republican candidate to the Forty-first, Forty-second, and Forty-third Congresses, serving from March 4, 1869, until March 3, 1875. He served as chairman of the Committee on Revolutionary Pensions during the Forty-first and Forty-second Congresses. He was an unsuccessful candidate for reelection in 1874 to the Forty-third Congress.

After leaving Congress, he resumed the practice of law in Montpelier and served as a member of the commission to revise the laws of Vermont in 1879 and 1880. Willard died on June 8, 1880, in Montpelier, and is interred in Green Mount Cemetery in Montpelier.

Personal life
Willard married Emily Doane Reed on August 24, 1855. They had four children, Mary Willard, Ashton R. Willard, Eliza M. Willard and Charles W. Willard.

References

External links
 
 Biographical Directory of the United States Congress: WILLARD, Charles Wesley, (1827 - 1880)
 Govtrack.us: Rep. Charles Willard
 The Political Graveyard: Willard, Charles Wesley (1827-1880)
 

1827 births
1880 deaths
Secretaries of State of Vermont
Dartmouth College alumni
Republican Party members of the United States House of Representatives from Vermont
19th-century American politicians
Burials at Green Mount Cemetery (Montpelier, Vermont)